The 2020–21 Little Rock Trojans men's basketball team represented the University of Arkansas at Little Rock in the 2020–21 NCAA Division I men's basketball season. The Trojans, led by third-year head coach Darrell Walker, played their home games at the Jack Stephens Center in Little Rock, Arkansas as members of the Sun Belt Conference. With the creation of divisions to cut down on travel due to the COVID-19 pandemic, they played in the West Division.

Previous season
The Trojans finished the 2019–20 season 21–10, 15–5 in Sun Belt play to win the Sun Belt regular season championship. They were the No. 1 seed in the Sun Belt tournament, however, the tournament was cancelled amid the COVID-19 pandemic. Due to the Sun Belt Tournament cancellation, they were awarded the Sun Belt's automatic bid to the NCAA tournament. However, the NCAA Tournament was also cancelled due to the same outbreak.

Roster

Schedule and results

|-
!colspan=12 style=| Non-conference regular season

|-
!colspan=9 style=| Sun Belt Conference regular season

|-
!colspan=12 style=| Sun Belt tournament

Source

References

Little Rock Trojans men's basketball seasons
Little Rock Trojans
Little Rock Trojans men's basketball
Little Rock Trojans men's basketball